Yuriy Volodymyrovych Cheban (born 5 July 1986 in Odessa, Ukraine) is a retired Ukrainian sprint canoeist. He is the 2012 and 2016 Olympic champion in C-1 200 metres.

Career
In 2003, despite being a year younger than many of his rivals, he was a world junior silver medallist at Komatsu, Japan in the Canadian canoe C-1 1000 m and also finished fourth in the C-1 500 m event. Having won the 2004 European Junior Championships at both the C-1 500 m and C-1 1000 m in Poznań, Poland, Cheban was selected to represent Ukraine in both C-1 events at the 2004 Summer Olympics.

Competing against much more experienced canoeists, he placed sixth in his initial heat of the C-1 500 m with a time of 2:00.238, qualifying for the semifinals. In the semifinal, he again placed sixth with a time of 1:53.385, and did not advance to the finals.

In C-1 1000 m, Cheban finished sixth in his heat with a time of 4:00.637. He was disqualified in the semifinal.

In 2005, Cheban and partner Petro Kruh won the European under-23 C-2 1000 m title in Plovdiv, Bulgaria. At the senior World Championships in Zagreb, Croatia they were the youngest of the C-2 1000 m finalists, placing ninth.

In 2006 Cheban returned to the individual C-1 event and it proved to be his most successful season yet. In July he took the C-1 500 m bronze medal at the 2006 European Championships in Račice, Czech Republic – his first senior medal. The following month he went one better, winning the silver medal at the World Championships in Szeged. Cheban would win gold in the C-1 200 m event at the 2007 championships in Duisburg.

He won a bronze medal in the C1 500m event at the 2008 Summer Olympics in Beijing. He is a member of the Yuzhne club.

At the 2010 championships, Cheban won two medals with a silver in the C-1 4 × 200 m and a bronze in the C-1 200 m (tied with Canada's Richard Dalton).

While at the 2012 Olympics in London, he won the C-1 200m event, beating his opponent Ivan Shtyl' from Russia. He succeeded in defending his title four years later at the 2016 Olympics, defeating his former teammate, Valentin Demyanenko, who competed for Azerbaijan.

References

External links
 
 
 

1986 births
Canoeists at the 2004 Summer Olympics
Canoeists at the 2008 Summer Olympics
Canoeists at the 2012 Summer Olympics
Canoeists at the 2016 Summer Olympics
Living people
Armed Forces sports society (Ukraine) athletes
Olympic canoeists of Ukraine
Olympic bronze medalists for Ukraine
Sportspeople from Odesa
Ukrainian male canoeists
Olympic medalists in canoeing
Olympic gold medalists for Ukraine
ICF Canoe Sprint World Championships medalists in Canadian
Medalists at the 2012 Summer Olympics
Medalists at the 2008 Summer Olympics
Medalists at the 2016 Summer Olympics
Canoeists at the 2015 European Games
European Games competitors for Ukraine
Recipients of the Order of Merit (Ukraine), 2nd class
Recipients of the Order of Merit (Ukraine), 3rd class
Recipients of the Order For Courage, 3rd class
K. D. Ushinsky South Ukrainian National Pedagogical University alumni
Ukrainian people of Moldovan descent